Niyol railway station is a railway station in Surat district of Gujarat state of India. It is under  of Western Railway zone of Indian Railways. The station consists of 2 platforms. It is located on Udhna–Jalgaon line of the Indian Railways.

It is located at 21 m above sea level and has two platforms. As of 2016, electrified double broad-gauge railway line exists at this station.

See also
 Surat district

References

Railway stations in Surat district
Mumbai WR railway division